Not Like Us is a 1995 American film. It was part of the Roger Corman Presents series.

Plot

Soon after the Joneses move in, residents of the town of Tranquility begin dropping dead.

Unknown to the residents, the Joneses are really two alien scientist who come to Earth to use experimental prlasti surgery techniques on humans.

Reception

Noting that this is a comedy-horror movie with its tongue firmly in its cheek, TV guide thought the movie failed to be funny while Creature Feature gave the movie 3.5 out of 5 stars.

Cast

Joanna Pacula ........... Anita Clark

Peter Onorati ............... Sam Clark

References

External links

Not Like Us at TCMDB
Not Like Us at Letterbox DVD

1996 films
Films produced by Roger Corman
1990s science fiction horror films
American science fiction horror films
1990s English-language films
1990s American films